Dorymyrmex chilensis is a species of ant in the genus Dorymyrmex. Described by Forel in 1911, the species is endemic to Chile.

References

Dorymyrmex
Hymenoptera of South America
Insects described in 1911
Endemic fauna of Chile